Meting is a small town in Sindh province of Pakistan. It lies at 25.73 Latitude and 67.94 Longitude. The town has also a railway station named Meting railway station.

References

External links
Map of Meting

Populated places in Sindh